The Hillsborough Agreement was an agreement reached in Northern Ireland that allowed the devolution of policing and justice powers to the Northern Ireland Executive. The agreement was made on 5 February 2010 and included an agreement on controversial parades and on implementing outstanding matters from the St Andrews Agreement. Additionally, it reworked the way in which the Minister of Justice is selected to be chosen with cross-community support rather than through the D'Hondt method used for most other ministers. 

It was signed at and named after Hillsborough Castle, Hillsborough, County Down. The Agreements of Sunningdale, Belfast and St Andrews were also negotiated in those places.

See also
 Belfast Agreement
 St Andrews Agreement

References

External links 
 The Hillsborough Castle Agreement
 Foster, David; Gay, Oonagh (18 March 2010). The Hillsborough Agreement

Politics of Ireland
Politics of Northern Ireland